The 2007 edition of the UCI Road World Championships Time Trial took place on September 27. The Championships was hosted by the German city of Stuttgart, and featured two laps of an urban circuit, amounting to 44.9 kilometres of racing against the clock.

This time trial was shorter than that of the 2006 edition in Salzburg, which was won by Swiss Fabian Cancellara.

Final classification

References
Race website
cyclingnews

Men's Time Trial
UCI Road World Championships – Men's time trial